Honor Is Dead is the second studio album by American heavy metal band Wovenwar. It was released on October 21, 2016, via Metal Blade Records.

Wovenwar would go on an indefinite hiatus following the release of the album. Since then, Blay returned to his main band Oh, Sleeper, while the rest of the band went on to reunite with Tim Lambesis and resume activities as As I Lay Dying.

Track listing

Personnel
Wovenwar
 Shane Blay - guitars, vocals, bass and vocal engineering
 Nick Hipa - guitars, guitar engineering
 Phil Sgrosso - guitars, guitar engineering
 Josh Gilbert - bass, vocals, bass and vocal engineering
 Jordan Mancino - drums

Additional musicians
 Alex Ballew - backing vocals
 Jesse Cash - backing vocals
 Luis Descartes - backing vocals
 Ian Eubanks - backing vocals
 Mike Levine - backing vocals

Production
 Daniel Castleman - drum engineering
 Ryan Clark - art direction, design
 Chris Gehringer - mastering
 Adam "Nolly" Getgood - mixing
 George Lever - mixing
 Joseph McQueen - drum and vocal engineering, mixing
 Jeremiah Scott - photography

References 

2016 albums
Wovenwar albums
Metal Blade Records albums